Ina Latendorf (born 26 June 1971) is a German politician from DIE LINKE. She was elected to the Bundestag at the 2021 federal election.

She contested the constituency of Schwerin – Ludwigslust-Parchim I – Nordwestmecklenburg I in western Mecklenburg-Vorpommern but came in fourth place. She won a seat on the state list.

See also 
List of members of the 20th Bundestag

References 

Living people
1971 births
Female members of the Bundestag
21st-century German politicians
21st-century German women politicians
Members of the Bundestag for The Left
Members of the Bundestag for Mecklenburg-Western Pomerania
Members of the Bundestag 2021–2025
People from Ludwigslust-Parchim
People from Greifswald
University of Greifswald alumni
Party of Democratic Socialism (Germany) politicians